DXGO may refer to:
 DXGO-AM, an AM radio station broadcasting in Davao City, branded as Aksyon Radyo
 DXGO-FM, an FM radio station broadcasting in Kidapawan, branded as Dream FM